Ophiomorus raithmai, known commonly as the eastern sand swimmer and the three-fingered sand-fish, is a species of skink, a lizard in the family Scincidae. The species is found in India and Pakistan.

Etymology
The specific name, raithmai, is derived from the Sindhi common name for this lizard, raith mai, which means "sand fish".

Geographic range
O. raithmai is found in northwestern India (Gujarat, Punjab, Rajasthan) and in adjacent southeastern Pakistan.

Habitat
The natural habitat of O. raithmai is desert.

Reproduction
O. raithmai is viviparous.

References

Further reading
Das I (2002). A Photographic Guide to Snakes and other Reptiles of India. Sanibel Island, Florida: Ralph Curtis Books. 144 pp. . (Ophiomorus raithmai, p. 112).
Greer AE, Wilson GDF (2001). "Comments on the scincid lizard genus Ophiomorus, with a cladistic analysis of the species". Hamadryad 26 (2): 261–271.
Sindaco R, Jeremčenko VK (2008). The Reptiles of the Western Palearctic. 1. Annotated Checklist and Distributional Atlas of the Turtles, Crocodiles, Amphisbaenians and Lizards of Europe, North Africa, Middle East and Central Asia. (Monographs of the Societas Herpetologica Italica). Latina, Italy: Edizioni Belvedere. 580 pp. .

Ophiomorus
Reptiles of India
Reptiles of Pakistan
Reptiles described in 1966
Taxa named by Steven C. Anderson
Taxa named by Alan E. Leviton